Ipswich station is an MBTA Commuter Rail station in Ipswich, Massachusetts. Located in downtown Ipswich, it serves the Newburyport/Rockport Line. The station is handicapped accessible, with a mini-high platform on the northern end of the platform.

The former Boston and Maine Railroad station building was demolished by 1962. Ipswich was the terminus of the line from April 1976, when the lone remaining round trip to Newburyport station was cut, until full service was restored on October 26, 1998. Just south of the end of the platform are two auxiliary tracks that were used to store trains during that time.

Connecting service
CATA provides weekend service during the summer on its Purple Line Ipswich - Essex - Crane Beach shuttle.

References

External links

 MBTA - Ipswich
 Station from Google Maps Street View

MBTA Commuter Rail stations in Essex County, Massachusetts
Stations along Boston and Maine Railroad lines